The Levita Stadium is a football stadium in Kfar Saba, Israel. It is currently used mostly for football matches and is the home stadium of Hapoel Kfar Saba and Beitar Kfar Saba.

Initial plans for building this stadium were drawn in the late 1960s, and construction began in 1972. However, financial difficulties caused the construction to stop mid-way in 1973 after the Yom Kippur War. The stadium was eventually completed in 1986 and its capacity of 5,800.

References

Hapoel Kfar Saba F.C.
Football venues in Israel
Sports venues completed in 1986
Sports venues in Central District (Israel)
1986 establishments in Israel